Bay City Central High School (BCC) is a high school located at 1624 Columbus Avenue, Bay City, Michigan, United States, and a part of Bay City Public Schools.  Its mascot is the wolf, and its colors are purple and gold.

Building history
The building that is now known as Bay City Central opened March 27, 1922.
The original architectural plans called for two floors, but a third was added to provide room for Bay City Junior College (which now exists as Delta College, and is now located in University Center, Michigan).  The "New Gymnasium" was constructed in 1957, and the cafeteria/commons received major renovations in 1995.  The school's bell tower (which contains two classrooms), as well as a copper-domed observatory on the roof was closed in 1983 due to fire code restrictions and remains unopened to this day.

Demographics 
The demographic breakdown of the 1,193 students enrolled in 2015–16 was:

 White – 78.6%
 Hispanic – 11.8%
 Black – 3.8%
 Multiracial – 3.7%
 American Indian/Alaska Native – 1.3%
 Asian – 0.67%
 Native Hawaiian/Pacific Islander – 0%

 Male – 50.9%
 Female – 49.1%

46.3% of the students were eligible for free or reduced-cost lunch.

Performing arts

Band
The high school band program hosts several bands like the Jazz Lab, and Central Air Jazz Band, two different steel drum bands, Symphony, and Wind Symphony, and formerly the Bay Youth Symphony Orchestra.

Radio
BCC is the location of the studios and transmitter for WCHW-FM, 91.3, a low power non-commercial FM station run by the students of the Bay City School District.

Choirs
Bay City Central's choir line-up includes mixed choir, concert choir and award-winning varsity choir, Resounding Harmony. It also has small acapella ensembles, The Girls, The Guys and 6 a.m.

Notable alumni
 Warren Avis, founder of Avis Rent a Car
 Bill Hewitt, American football
 Heidi J. Hoyle, United States Army general
 Trenton Robinson, American Football
 Myra C. Selby, Indiana Supreme Court, First woman, and first African-American Justice of the State of Indiana
John Emil List, Murderer

References

External links

Michigan Center for Civic Education website

Public high schools in Michigan
Educational institutions established in 1922
Bay City, Michigan
Schools in Bay County, Michigan
1922 establishments in Michigan